Hedi Slimane (born July 5, 1968) is a French photographer and grand couturier. From 2000 to 2007, he held the position of creative director for Dior Homme (the menswear line of Christian Dior). From 2012 to 2016, he was the creative director for Yves Saint Laurent.
Since February 1, 2018, Slimane has been the creative, artistic and image director of Celine.

In November 2018, Hedi Slimane topped the annual list of Vanity Fair's "50 most influential French people in the world".

Early life 
Slimane was born in the 19th arrondissement of Paris to a Tunisian father, who was an accountant, and an Italian mother, a dressmaker. Two of his uncles were tailors. In his youth, he and his mother made clothes together: Slimane sketched designs, the two would shop for fabrics and complete fittings, and his mother would cut and sew them. He considered finding a career in the Fashion industry as too competitive, instead, he studied Political Science and pursued a career in Journalism. At 11, he discovered photography, received his first camera and learned black and white darkroom printing. He studied Art History at the École du Louvre and completed a tailor apprenticeship at a men's designer house.

Fashion 
Slimane has no formal training in fashion. Early in his career he worked for designer José Lévy, and from 1992 to 1995 he assisted fashion consultant and press agent Jean-Jacques Picart on the centenary of the project "monogram canvas" of Louis Vuitton. The project invited seven fashion designers—Azzedine Alaia, Helmut Lang, Sybilla, Manolo Blahnik, Isaac Mizrahi, Romeo Gigli, and Vivienne Westwood—to reinterpret the monogram canvas in celebration of its longevity.

Picart introduced Slimane to Pierre Bergé, who was searching for a men's wear designer for Yves Saint Laurent. To Slimane's surprise, Pierre Bergé hired him in 1996 as ready-to-wear director of men's collections at the house, where he would later become artistic director. Slimane expressed great admiration for Yves Saint Laurent, yet he was not interested paying homage to the legendary designer—he was more interested in capturing the "spirit" and "mystique" of him. When Slimane started, there were only a handful of men's designs at the house dating from Mr. Saint Laurent's early years. Slimane created a new line built on these iconic pieces that was imbued with mystery, seduction, and an element of subversiveness. It also challenged gender roles, just as Mr. Saint Laurent had done earlier. Slimane expressed that "everything I do is based on seduction." One report describes his designs' sex appeal as, "not based on over-the-top embellishment ... rather, it comes from the same honest principles that have always driven fashion: cut, proportion and silhouette." Slimane's designs catapulted sales and led to their increased availability at boutiques around the world.

After the Black Tie collection for autumn-winter 2000–01, which foreshadowed the advent of Slimane's silhouette, and the debuts of "skinny," he chose to leave YSL, declined the offer of creative directorship at Jil Sander, and accepted the position of creative director for menswear at Christian Dior. In June 2001, he headed up the launch of Dior Homme's first fragrance under his creative control, named Higher. He designed the packaging and worked with Richard Avedon on the accompanying advertising campaign. In April 2002, Hedi Slimane was the first menswear designer to receive the CFDA award for International Designer. David Bowie, whom Hedi Slimane dressed for his tours, presented the award.

Thanks in part to Slimane, Dior's business, which includes haute couture, ready-to-wear and accessories, increased volume and profit by 41 percent in 2002. Brad Pitt had Slimane create his wedding suit for his marriage to Jennifer Aniston. Although he never designed a womenswear collection, he dressed female celebrities including Madonna and Nicole Kidman during his tenure at Dior. He furthermore created stagewear for groups such as The Libertines, Daft Punk, Franz Ferdinand, and The Kills, and artists such as Mick Jagger, Beck, and Jack White.

Slimane commissioned original soundtracks for his runway shows for Dior Homme, created by artists such as Beck, Readymade FC (Jean-Philippe Verdin), and bands such as Phoenix, The Rakes, and Razorlight. The track "In the Morning" was composed by Razorlight exclusively for the Dior Homme show. Slimane was known for working with emerging avant-garde artists. Readymade FC composed "F Me" (2001–02) and the legendary "Flexion" (2002–03). These New Puritans, composed "Navigate, Navigate" for the last défilé of Dior Homme in January 2007. Slimane became known for redefining the male silhouette, widely recreated in fashion and advertising (fashion and fragrances).

In July 2007, Slimane did not renew his contract at Dior Homme. The fashion house discussed the funding of Slimane's own label, but the discussions failed. Slimane had written on his website that he did not want to lose control of his name, and management of his own brand. He returned to fashion and portrait photography.

In March 2011, following John Galliano's dismissal from Dior, Slimane was linked with the job of new Dior creative director. In March 2012, Yves Saint Laurent and its parent company, PPR, officially stated that Slimane would replace Stefano Pilati as creative director at Yves Saint Laurent, after the departure of the latter, who held said position for almost eight years. He based his creative studio in Los Angeles, rather than the brand's Parisian headquarters. In April 2016, Slimane was succeeded by Anthony Vaccarello as creative director for Yves Saint Laurent.

In January 2018, LVMH announced that Slimane would take on the role of creative director at Céline. Following the rebranding direction, Slimane has dropped the French accent for Céline, making it Celine.

In April 2018, Slimane won more than 8 million euros in a lawsuit against Kering S.A. after he was paid only €667,000 instead of €10 million for his non-compete clause.

In January 2019, Slimane presented his first stand-alone menswear show for Celine.

On June 26, 2022, Slimane showed his spring/summer 2023 collection for Celine at the Palais de Tokyo, the same location where he presented his autumn/winter collection for Dior Homme twenty years earlier. Published notes accompanying the show quote him as saying, "[I] wanted to pay tribute to the institution and remember this moment in [my] menswear reform." The show demonstrated his "unrelenting aesthetic vision that is defined by the fusion of the high-luxury of the Celine atelier and a rebellious, rock and roll sensibility."

Art and photography 
In 2000, Visionaire magazine, a New York quarterly that commissions publication projects on fashion, asked Slimane to guest edit its next issue. Published in an edition of 6,000 and priced at $175, Slimane's proposal of his own vision of Paris as a city of the future involved the participation of 29 artists, photographers, architects, musicians, and graphic and Web site designers.

Immediately after leaving Yves Saint Laurent, Slimane moved to Berlin, where, upon the invitation by curator Klaus Biesenbach, he took up a residency at the Kunst-Werke Institute for Contemporary Art between 2000 and 2002. Berlin, a selection of black and white photographs published by Editions 7L/Steidl with Karl Lagerfeld and Steidl in 2002, was Slimane's first book documenting the Berlin scene. Stage, published by Steidl in 2004, is his second book published on the rock revival and the 2.0 generation. Also in 2004, Slimane created the album cover for the band Phoenix's album Alphabetical.

London Birth of a Cult, released by Steidl in 2005, described the daily life of a young, unknown British rock star Pete Doherty. Pete Doherty is surrounded by The Paddingtons, his fans, and he symbolized the new generation of London punk rock. The book foreshadowed the project on "London". Slimane proposed "London" to the French daily Libération. The London issue, published in May 2005, marked the beginning of the British onslaught, and its adoption by a new generation of French fans. On July 5, 2005, Slimane celebrated his birthday at Tryptique club in Paris where Doherty took stage by surprise and sang Happy Birthday. The Paddingtons and The Others also performed.

In May 2006, Hedi Slimane created the photographic blog Hedi Slimane Diary. Slimane created his Rock Diary, beginning in 2004 in collaboration with the British journalist from NME, Alex Needham. In addition, he shot spreads for magazines including French Vogue, VMAN, and Purple.

When Slimane left for America and based himself in Los Angeles in 2007, California became the subject of many of his images and later the subject of several exhibitions.

In 2011, he curated "Myths and Legends of Los Angeles" a group show of Californian artists, including John Baldessari, Ed Ruscha, Chris Burden, Sterling Ruby, Mark Hagen, and Patrick Hill at Almine Rech Gallery in Paris and Brussels. His own work was shown in 2011 at the MOCA, where Slimane presented a photographic installation that showcased an archive of images from his California period. The exhibition, titled "California Song", was created in a kinematics way, accompanied by a soundtrack by the musical group No Age. No Age performed on the opening night on November 11, 2011, drawing a record attendance of over 2,000 people for the MOCA. The opening night performance became the subject of a documentary by Slimane and Commonwealth. Christopher Owens, the singer of Girls, was the lead figure of "California Song". Digital slide show billboards were seen in the streets of Los Angeles showcasing the MOCA exhibition.

Commissioned for the 2011 debut issue of Garage, a magazine created by Dasha Zhukova, Slimane designed one of the three versions of the publication's covers. His photograph showed the lower half of 23-year-old nude model Shauna Taylor, whose crotch is covered by a green butterfly sticker created by Damien Hirst. The sticker peels off (inspired by the Velvet Underground album art by Andy Warhol) to reveal a butterfly tattoo, also of Hirst's design. He is also a photographer for Hero magazine.

Bibliography 
 2002 – Intermission 1, Charta
 2003 – Berlin, Steidl/7L
 2004 – Stage, Steidl/7L
 2005 – London Birth of A Cult, Steidl/7L
 2005 – Interzone: The Hedi Slimane Book, Purple Fashion 4
 2006 – Portrait of A Performer: Courtney Love, a Visionaire bookzine
 2007 – Costa Da Caparica 1989 exhibition catalogue
 2008 – Rock Diary, JRP-Ringier
 2009 – American Youth, DVD Box set, MK2
 2011 – Anthology of A Decade, JRP-Ringier. (Collection; divided into 4 Books: France, UK, US, DE/RU)

Exhibitions 
 2004 – Berlin at Kunstwerke, Berlin
 2004 – Berlin at MOMA/PS1, New York
 2004 – Berlin at Koyanagi Gallery, Tokyo
 2004 – Stage at Almine Rech Gallery, Paris
 2005 – Robert Mapplethorpe curated by Hedi Slimane, at Thaddeus Ropac Gallery, Paris
 2005 – Thank You For The Music group show, Spruth Magers Gallery, Munich
 2006 – As Tears Go By at Almine Rech Gallery, Paris
 2006 – I Love My Scene group show curated by Jose Freire, Mary Boone Gallery, New York
 2006 – Portrait of A Performer at Galerie Gmurzynska, Zurich
 2007 – Costa Da Caparica at Ellipse Foundation, Lisbon
 2007 – Sweet Bird of Youth group show curated by Hedi Slimane at Arndt and Partner, Berlin
 2007 – Young American at Foam Museum, Amsterdam
 2007 – Perfect Stranger at Almine Rech Gallery, Paris
 2008 – MUSAC Museum for Contemporary Art, Leon, Spain
 2011 – Fragments Americana at Almine Rech Gallery, Brussels
 2011 – California Dreamin, Myths and Legends of Los Angeles group show curated by Hedi Slimane, Almine Rech Gallery, Paris
 2011 – California Song at MOCA, Los Angeles
 2014 – SONIC at The Fondation Pierre Bergé – Yves Saint Laurent, Paris

References

External links 
 

1968 births
Living people
French fashion designers
LGBT fashion designers
French people of Tunisian descent
French people of Italian descent
French photographers
École du Louvre alumni
Dior people